The 1913 team saw the team named shortened to the Brooklyn Dodgers, and the team moved into the new stadium at Ebbets Field. Jake Daubert won the Chalmers Award as the leagues Most Valuable Player. Still, the team finished only in sixth place.

Offseason 
 November 1912: Elmer Brown was purchased by the Dodgers from the St. Louis Browns.

Regular season

Season standings

Record vs. opponents

Notable transactions 
 August 14, 1913: Eddie Stack and cash were traded by the Dodgers to the Chicago Cubs for Ed Reulbach.

Roster

Player stats

Batting

Starters by position 
Note: Pos = Position; G = Games played; AB = At bats; H = Hits; Avg. = Batting average; HR = Home runs; RBI = Runs batted in

Other batters 
Note: G = Games played; AB = At bats; H = Hits; Avg. = Batting average; HR = Home runs; RBI = Runs batted in

Pitching

Starting pitchers 
Note: G = Games pitched; IP = Innings pitched; W = Wins; L = Losses; ERA = Earned run average; SO = Strikeouts; BB = Walks

Other pitchers 
Note: G = Games pitched; IP = Innings pitched; W = Wins; L = Losses; ERA = Earned run average; SO = Strikeouts; BB = Walks

Awards and honors 
National League Most Valuable Player
Jake Daubert

References

External links 
Baseball-Reference season page
Baseball Almanac season page
1913 Brooklyn Dodgers uniform
Brooklyn Dodgers reference site
Acme Dodgers page 
Retrosheet

Brooklyn Dodgers season
Los Angeles Dodgers seasons
Brook
1910s in Brooklyn
Flatbush, Brooklyn